Maipo may refer to:

Maipo, Chile, a town in Buin, Chile
San José de Maipo, a town in Chile
Maipo (volcano), a volcano on the border of Argentina and Chile
Maipo River, the river that rises on the west slope Maipo volcano and flows through the Santiago Metropolitan Region of Chile
Maipo Province, a province in the Santiago Metropolitan Region of Chile
Maipo Island
Maipo Valley
 Maipo, a code-name for version 7 of Red Hat Enterprise Linux

See also
Mai Po Marshes
Maipú (disambiguation)